Thorleif Alfred "Tulley" Peterson (September 9, 1885 – January 9, 1982) was an American farmer and politician.

Peterson was born in the town of Utica, Crawford County, Wisconsin. He was a farmer and was involved with the cheese, creamery, and insurance businesses. Peterson served on the Utica Town Board and was the chairman of the town board. He also served on the Star Valley School Board. Peterson served in the Wisconsin Assembly from 1933 to 1937 and was a Democrat. He was involved in the good roads movement, and in 1935 he introduced an unsuccessful bill to limit road speeds on Wisconsin highways. In 1958, Peterson moved to Viroqua, Wisconsin. He died in Viroqua, Wisconsin.

Notes

References

External links

1885 births
1982 deaths
People from Utica, Crawford County, Wisconsin
People from Viroqua, Wisconsin
Businesspeople from Wisconsin
Farmers from Wisconsin
Wisconsin city council members
Mayors of places in Wisconsin
School board members in Wisconsin
Democratic Party members of the Wisconsin State Assembly
20th-century American politicians
20th-century American businesspeople